Social anxiety is the anxiety and fear specifically linked to being in social settings (i.e., interacting with others). Some categories of disorders associated with social anxiety include anxiety disorders, mood disorders, autism spectrum disorders, eating disorders, and substance use disorders. Individuals with higher levels of social anxiety often avert their gazes, show fewer facial expressions, and show difficulty with initiating and maintaining a conversation. Social anxiety commonly manifests itself in the teenage years and can be persistent throughout life, however, people who experience problems in their daily functioning for an extended period of time can develop social anxiety disorder. Trait social anxiety, the stable tendency to experience this anxiety, can be distinguished from state anxiety, the momentary response to a particular social stimulus. Half of the individuals with any social fears meet the criteria for social anxiety disorder. Age, culture, and gender impact the severity of this disorder. The function of social anxiety is to increase arousal and attention to social interactions, inhibit unwanted social behavior, and motivate preparation for future social situations.

Stages

Child development
Some feelings of anxiety in social situations are normal and necessary for effective social functioning and developmental growth. Cognitive advances and increased pressures in late childhood and early adolescence result in repeated social anxiety. Adolescents have identified their most common anxieties as focused on relationships with peers to whom they are attracted, peer rejection, public speaking, blushing, self-consciousness, panic, and past behavior. Most adolescents progress through their fears and meet the developmental demands placed on them. More and more children are being diagnosed with social anxiety, and this can lead to problems with education if not closely monitored. Part of social anxiety is fear of being criticized by others, and in children, social anxiety causes extreme distress over everyday activities such as playing with other kids, reading in class, or speaking to adults. On the other hand, some children with social anxiety will act out because of their fear. The problem with identifying social anxiety disorder in children is difficulty in determining the difference between social anxiety and basic shyness. Social anxiety also caused nervousness or crying in an event where they feel anxious.

Adults
It can be easier to identify social anxiety within adults because they tend to shy away from any social situation and keep to themselves. Common adult forms of social anxiety include performance anxiety, public speaking anxiety, stage fright, and timidness. All of these may also assume clinical forms, i.e., become anxiety disorders (see below).

Criteria that distinguish between clinical and nonclinical forms of social anxiety include the intensity and level of behavioral and psychosomatic disruption (discomfort) in addition to the anticipatory nature of the fear. Social anxieties may also be classified according to the broadness of triggering social situations. For example, fear of eating in public has a very narrow situational scope (eating in public), while shyness may have a wide scope (a person may be shy of doing many things in various circumstances). The clinical (disorder) forms are also divided into general social phobia (i.e., social anxiety disorder) and specific social phobia.

Disorder

Social anxiety disorder (SAD), also known as social phobia, is an anxiety disorder characterized by a significant amount of fear in one or more social situations causing considerable distress and impaired ability to function in at least some parts of daily life. These fears can be triggered by perceived or actual scrutiny from others. Social anxiety disorder affects 8% of women and 6.1% of men, likely due to difference in hormones and brain chemistry. In the United States, anxiety disorders are the most common mental illness. They affect 40 million adults, ages 18 and older. Anxiety can come in different forms and panic attacks can lead to panic disorders which is the fear of having a panic attack in public. Other related anxiety disorders include social anxiety disorder, generalized anxiety disorder, obsessive compulsive disorder (OCD), various types of phobias, and post traumatic stress disorder (PTSD). Fortunately, it is highly treatable and not everyone needs the treatment.

Physical symptoms often include excessive blushing, excess sweating, trembling, palpitations, and nausea. Stammering may be present, along with rapid speech. Panic attacks can also occur under intense fear and discomfort. Some sufferers may use alcohol or other drugs to reduce fears and inhibitions at social events. It is common for sufferers of social phobia to self-medicate in this fashion, especially if they are undiagnosed, untreated, or both; this can lead to alcoholism, eating disorders or other kinds of substance abuse. SAD is sometimes referred to as an "illness of lost opportunities" where "individuals make major life choices to accommodate their illness". According to ICD-10 guidelines, the main diagnostic criteria of social anxiety disorder are fear of being the focus of attention, or fear of behaving in a way that will be embarrassing or humiliating, often coupled with avoidance and anxiety symptoms. Standardized rating scales can be used to screen for social anxiety disorder and measure the severity of anxiety.

== Signs and symptoms ==
Blushing is a physiological response unique to humans and is a hallmark physiological response associated with social anxiety. Blushing is the  involuntary reddening of the face, neck, and chest in reaction to evaluation or social attention. Blushing occurs not only in response to feelings of embarrassment but also other socially-oriented emotions such as shame, guilt, shyness, and pride. Individuals high in social anxiety perceive themselves as blushing more than those who are low in social anxiety. Three types of blushing can be measured: self-perceived blushing (how much the individual believes they are blushing), physiological blushing (blushing as measured by physiological indices), and observed blushing (blushing observed by others). Social anxiety is strongly associated with self-perceived blushing, weakly associated with blushing as measured by physiological indices such as temperature and blood flow to the cheeks and forehead, and moderately associated with observed blushing. The relationship between physiological blushing and self-perceived blushing is small among those high in social anxiety, indicating that individuals with high social anxiety may overestimate their blushing. That social anxiety is associated most strongly with self-perceived blushing is also important for cognitive models of blushing and social anxiety, indicating that socially anxious individuals use both internal cues and other types of information to draw conclusions about how they are coming across. Individuals with social anxiety might also refrain from making eye contact, or constantly fiddling with things during conversations or public speaking. Other indicators are physical symptoms which may include rapid heartbeat, muscle tension, dizziness and lightheadedness, stomach trouble and diarrhea, unable to catch a breath, and “out of body” sensation.

Attention bias 
Individuals who tend to experience more social anxiety turn their attention away from threatening social information and toward themselves, prohibiting them from challenging negative expectations about others and maintaining high levels of social anxiety. A socially anxious individual perceives rejection from a conversational partner, turns his or her attention away, and never learns that the individual is actually welcoming. Individuals who are high in social anxiety tend to show increased initial attention toward negative social cues such as threatening faces followed by attention away from these social cues, indicating a pattern of hypervigilance followed by avoidance. Attention in social anxiety has been measured using the dot-probe paradigm, which presents two faces next to one another. One face has an emotional expression and the other has a neutral expression, and when the faces disappear, a probe appears in the location of one of the faces. This creates a congruent condition in which the probe appears in the same location as the emotional face and an incongruent condition. Participants respond to the probe by pressing a button and differences in reaction times reveal attentional biases. This task has revealed mixed results, with some studies finding no differences between socially anxious individuals and controls, some studies finding avoidance of all faces, and others finding vigilance toward threat faces. There is some evidence that vigilance toward threat faces can be detected during short but not longer exposures to faces, indicating a possible initial hypervigilance followed by avoidance. The Face-in-the-crowd task shows that individuals with social anxiety are faster at detecting an angry face in a predominantly neutral or positive crowd or slower at detecting happy faces than a nonanxious person. Results overall using this task are mixed and this task may not be able to detect hypervigilance toward angry faces in social anxiety.

Focus on the self has been associated with increased social anxiety and negative affect, however, there are two types of self-focus: In public self-focus, one shows concern for the impact of one's own actions on others and their impressions. This type of self-focus predicts greater social anxiety. Other more private forms of self-consciousness (e.g., egocentric goals) are associated with other types of negative affect.

Basic science research suggests that cognitive biases can be modified. Attention bias modification training has been shown to temporarily impact social anxiety.

Triggers and behaviors 
Triggers are sets of events or actions that can remind someone of a previous trauma. This could lead that person to have an emotional or physical reaction to the event or action. Individuals could also have behavioral changes such as avoid going out into public or situations that might direct excessive focus and attention toward them and they may not go to certain activities because they fear of embarrassment, they make them isolated and start drinking. For someone who has social anxiety this could lead them to have a panic attack. Behaviors associated with social anxiety can trigger anxiety attacks. These can easily be triggered when the person is in a situation such as eating in front of other people, speaking in public, being the center of attention, talking to strangers, going on dates, meeting new people, interviewing for a new job, going to work or school, looking other people in the eyes, making phone calls in public, or using public restrooms. There are many negative side effects that can come from social anxiety if untreated. Some issues that could arise from not seeking treatment for is low self-esteem, trouble being assertive, negative self, hypersensitivity to criticism, poor social skills, becoming isolated and having difficulties with social relationships, low academic and employment achievements, substance abuse and or suicide or suicidal attempts.

Measures and treatment 
Trait social anxiety is most commonly measured by self-report. This method possesses limitations, however subjective responses are the most reliable indicator of a subjective state. Other measures of social anxiety include diagnostic interviews, clinician-administered instruments, and behavioral assessments. No single trait social anxiety self-report measure shows all psychometric properties including different kinds of validity (content validity, criterion validity, construct validity), reliability, and  internal consistency. The SIAS along with the SIAS-6A and -6B are rated as the best.  These measures include:
 Fear of Negative Evaluation (FNE) and Brief form (BFNE)
 Fear Questionnaire Social Phobic Subscale (FQSP)
 Interaction Anxiousness Scale (IAS)
 Liebowitz Social Anxiety Scale-Self Report (LSAS-SR)
 Older Adult Social-Evaluative Situations (OASES)
 Social Avoidance and Distress (SAD)
 Self-Consciousness Scale (SCC)
 Social Interaction Anxiety Scale (SIAS) and brief form (SIAS-6A and -6B)
 Social Interaction Phobia Scale (SIPS)
 Social Phobia and Anxiety Inventory (SPAI) and brief form (SPAI-23)
 Situational Social Avoidance (SSA)
Many types of treatments are available for Social Anxiety Disorder. The disorder can more effectively be treated if identified early (i.e., in the early teenage years when SAD onset usually occurs), considering individual patients’ backgrounds and needs, and often through combining behavioural and pharmacological interventions. The first line treatment for social anxiety disorder is cognitive behavioral therapy (CBT) with medications recommended only in those who are not interested in therapy. CBT is effective in treating social phobia, whether delivered individually or in a group setting. The cognitive and behavioral components seek to change thought patterns and physical reactions to anxiety-inducing situations. The cognitive part of cognitive behavioral therapy helps individuals with social anxiety decrease and practice unhelpful thoughts and allow new patterns of positive thinking. The behavioral component involves group therapy to help build up confidence. The attention given to social anxiety disorder has significantly increased since 1999 with the approval and marketing of drugs for its treatment. Prescribed medications include several classes of antidepressants: selective serotonin reuptake inhibitors (SSRIs), serotonin-norepinephrine reuptake inhibitors (SNRIs), and monoamine oxidase inhibitors (MAOIs). Other commonly used medications include beta blockers and benzodiazepines. It is the most common anxiety disorder with up to 10% of people being affected at some point in their life. Other treatments that individuals with social anxiety may find helpful include massages, meditation, mindfulness, hypnotherapy and acupuncture although it does not help make a full recovery of social anxiety it does decrease some.

Evolutionary and genetic theories 

There are a number of evolutionary theories on how social anxiety may have developed, the most prominent of which is exclusion theory.

Social anxiety may have developed from fearful temperament and either underdeveloped social skills or excessive socialization of a child to the point that they are hyper-aware of inappropriate social situations.
Genetic inheritance of a high level of sensory processing sensitivity.
Prepared by evolutionary history to have anxiety (fear) towards objects and situations which were previously perceived as a threat by our early ancestors.
Social anxiety as a way to maintain cohesion in a society
Social anxiety triggered by competition for status and resources
Fostering social inclusion and reducing the risk of exclusion/rejection

Biological adaptation to living in small groups 
There is a suggestion that people have adapted to live with others in small groups. Living in a group is attractive to humans as there are more people to provide labor, protection, and a concentration of potential mates.

Working together to gather these resources is a major attraction. Any perceived threat to group resources should therefore leave an individual on guard, as would any potential position of status that might bring conflict with others as it may reduce an individual's access to group resources. In effect, anxiety in this way is adaptive because it helps people understand what is socially acceptable and what is not. The threat of exclusion from resources could lead to death.

These resources also allow individuals to have enough status to attract a mate. As a lot of evolutionary theory is concerned with reproduction, the benefit of exposure to potential mates within a group also cannot be overemphasized.

Finally, at a basic level, being confined to a particular group of people limits exposure to certain diseases. Studies have suggested that social affiliation has an impact on health and the more integrated and accepted we are, the healthier we are.

Fathers 
Access to resources and compatibility within a group impacts an individual's mate selection. Due to the vulnerability of human mothers and babies after birth, fathers may have had to protect both individuals. Fathers would then spend less time with the child as they were investing more time mastering the external environment for the safety and security of mother and child. Fathers may be confronting external forces threatening resources or social status.

Exclusion theory 

At its simplest, social anxiety might be regarded as a basic human need to 'fit' into a given social group. Someone might be excluded due to their inability to contribute to a group, deviance from group standards, or even unattractiveness. Due to the benefits of living in a group, an individual would want to avoid social isolation at any cost. Anxiety may serve as anticipation of an event that may lead to social exclusion.

One example of this offers a new perspective on the Oedipus complex. The Oedipus Complex is a concept in psychoanalytic theory that traditionally refers to an inherent desire in boys and men to kill their father and have sex with their mother. According to psychoanalytic theory, this motivation is abandoned due to fears of castration. An alternate, and potentially more practical, interpretation of the Oedipus complex is that the infant fears being abandoned and excluded from their family. The same conclusion can be applied to children who wish to sleep with their parents at night; they fear social exclusion rather than having a desire to have sex with a parent.

Ultimately, social anxiety - as interpreted by exclusion theory - emphasizes people's need to be accepted by other people. Knowing what is and is not seen as attractive to others allows individuals to prevent rejection, criticisms, or exclusion from others. There is a reason that adultery, mate poaching, and murder are prominent reasons for group exclusion, as they impact the reproductive and physical fitness of the group. Humans are physiologically sensitive to social cues and therefore detect changes in interactions which may indicate dissatisfaction or unpleasant reactions. People can enhance how others view them by wearing particular clothes, accomplishing academic achievements, playing a certain sport, etc. All of these variables are attributes of how attractive an individual is perceived.

Overall, social anxiety may serve as a way for people to anticipate certain actions that might bring social exclusion.

See also 

 
 Alexithymia
 Agoraphobia
 Asociality
 Autism spectrum (Asperger syndrome, Autism)
 Avoidant personality disorder
 Highly sensitive person
 Major depressive disorder
 Obsessive-compulsive disorder 
 Schizoid personality disorder 
 Selective mutism
 Social inhibition
 Social isolation

References

Anxiety disorders